Addison Wiggin is an American financial writer, publisher, and filmmaker. He is executive publisher of Agora Financial, LLC and is a New York Times bestselling author.

Financial writing and analysis 
Wiggin has asserted that private investment, not government funding, is the crucial factor in advancing economic recovery.

In a 2005 article for The New York Times Magazine, Stephen Metcalf described Wiggin as bullish on gold and critical of the Federal Reserve and American indebtedness:
The narrative Wiggin spun out for me over lunch is repeated, nearly verbatim, by almost everyone in the gold community. "This is the blow-off phase for the Great Dollar Era. We're in an unsustainable trend right now," Wiggin told me, ticking off the miscalculations that have brought us to the brink of an economic apocalypse. To begin with, the U.S. has become the world's biggest debtor, with three outstanding obligations at alarming highs: consumer debt, or our mortgages and credit cards; the federal deficit; and our current account deficit with foreign countries. Federal Reserve Chairman Alan Greenspan, Wiggin continued, has simply shifted one bubble -- the 90's bubble in stocks and bonds -- into another, in real estate and "overconsumption," or the American propensity to pay for an ever-more-lavish lifestyle on credit.

In a June 2011 interview with America's Radio News, Wiggin expressed concern about a series of asset bubbles and related trends in government spending.
...The financial markets in 2001 and 2002 got crushed because of the dot-com bubble, and then we saw that again in 2006 and 2007. Expected revenues from rising house prices never materialized, because the housing market fell apart.

The country is addicted to these asset bubbles. And politicians, while making their budgets—it happens at all levels, at state, local, federal and with all the agencies—they kind of plan the spending based on anticipated revenues from these rising asset bubbles. But when the asset bubbles fall apart, when the housing bubble crashes, and when the stock market goes down, those revenues never materialize, but the spending continues.

Publishing work at Agora
In his role at Agora Financial, a subsidiary of Agora Inc., Wiggin is editorial director of publications such as The Daily Reckoning and 5-Minute Forecast, and several financial newsletters including Outstanding Investments and Capital & Crisis.

Documentary film
Another Agora Inc. subsidiary, Agora Entertainment, was created to finance the production of I.O.U.S.A., a feature-length documentary film directed by Patrick Creadon. Wiggin served as executive producer of the film and co-authored a companion book of the same title with Kate Incontrera. The documentary was entered in the Sundance Film Festival in 2008. Film critic Roger Ebert named I.O.U.S.A. one of the top five documentary films of 2008.

Books
 Financial Reckoning Day: Surviving the Soft Depression of the 21st Century (with Bill Bonner). John Wiley & Sons. 2004. .
 Empire of Debt: Rise of an Epic Financial Crisis (with Bill Bonner). John Wiley & Sons. 2005. .
 Demise of the Dollar: And Why it is Great for Your Investments. John Wiley & Sons. 2005. .
 I.O.U.S.A.: One Nation. Under Stress. In Debt. (with Kate Incontrera). John Wiley & Sons. 2008. . Companion book to the I.O.U.S.A. film.
 The New Empire of Debt: The Rise and Fall of an Epic Financial Bubble (with Bill Bonner). John Wiley & Sons. 2009. .
 The Little Book of the Shrinking Dollar: What You Can Do to Protect Your Money Now. John Wiley & Sons. 2012. .

References

Living people
Year of birth missing (living people)
American non-fiction writers
American financial writers